Pascal Posado (14 May 1925 – 11 November 2016) was a French politician. He served as a Communist member of the National Assembly in 1978, representing Bouches-du-Rhône.

Early life
Pascal Posado was born on 14 May 1925 in Marseille, France. His parents were immigrants from Spain.

Career
Posado started his career as an apprentice for the SNCASE at the age of 15. Meanwhile, he joined the General Confederation of Labour and destroyed Messerschmitt aircraft made by the SNCASE.

Posado joined the French Communist Party in 1944. He served as a Communist member of the National Assembly from 15 January 1978 to 2 April 1978, representing Bouches-du-Rhône. He also served on the city council of Marseille from 1965 to 1983, and as the mayor of the 15th and 16th arrondissements of Marseille from 1983 to 1989. He then served on the city council of Marseille again from 1989 to 1995.

Death
Posado died on 11 November 2016 in Marseille.

Works

References

1925 births
2016 deaths
Politicians from Marseille
French people of Spanish descent
Mayors of places in Provence-Alpes-Côte d'Azur
French Communist Party politicians
Deputies of the 5th National Assembly of the French Fifth Republic
Members of the General Confederation of Labour (France)